Sgt. Pecker is an album by American comedian, comedy writer and radio personality Jackie Martling.  The album was released on November 5, 1996 on the Oglio Records label.

Track listing
Meatballs & Monkeys
Canines & Canyons
Rags & Racers
Habits & Heroes
Myths & Moms
Trips & Traps
Pigs & Pee
Herds & Hookers
Lovers & Litters
Diapers & Diggers
Stoppers & Stingers
Fowls & Fatsos
Digits & Dweebs
Dinosaurs & Daddies

Background
In 1979, Martling issued his debut LP, What Did You Expect?  He released two more albums, 1980's Goin' Ape! and 1981's Normal People Are People You Don't Know That Well.  Martling sent all three records to fledgling New York City disk jockey Howard Stern. By 1986, he was a full-time member of Stern's show, later becoming the program's head writer. Martling maintained a steady schedule of live dates while working with Stern, recording Joke Man, F Jackie, and The Very Best of Jackie Martling's Talking Joke Book Cassettes, Vol. 1.  Sgt. Pecker is the second CD from Martling's Stern era.

Critical reception
Sgt. Pecker made its appearance some ten years into Martling's stint as head writer for The Howard Stern Show and offered radio listeners who had not seen the "Joke Man" deliver jokes in person certain access to a seasoned comic performer.  Stephen Thomas Erlewine gives a new listener requisite perspective on the album, suggesting it has its merits:

While there aren't as many outright hilarious jokes as on its predecessor, Sgt. Pecker is nearly as good as Jackie Martling's first opus, Joke Man. Boasting a wide array of bathroom, sex and  jokes, there's something here to offend everybody, but there's also enough unexpected twists and punchlines to make much of the album truly funny as well. If you like your humor raunchy, you're unlikely to be disappointed by Sgt. Pecker.

Reviews
Allmusic  [ link]

Notes

1996 albums
Jackie Martling albums
1990s comedy albums
Oglio Records live albums